Sam Dower Jr. (born November 6, 1990) is an American basketball player. Standing 6'9, he mainly plays the power forward position. He played college basketball for Gonzaga and currently plays for Polish pro basketball team MKS Dąbrowa Górnicza.

College career 

Dower committed to Gonzaga over scholarship offers from Marquette, Minnesota, California and George Mason. He redshirted his first year. In his first collegiate game, he scored 19 points in 17 minutes against Southern. He was later named to the WCC All-Freshman Team. As a sophomore, he recorded his first double-double with 20 points and 10 rebounds in a win against Xavier. As a junior, he started seven of the first nine games until Kelly Olynyk took his place at the power forward position. After three successful seasons, in which he was Gonzaga's top scorer off the bench, Dower shouldered the responsibilities as a senior and shared a role with Kevin Pangos as Gonzaga's top scoring option.  He sustained an injury as a senior against Kansas State on December 21, 2013, and missed three games. Nonetheless, Dower led the Bulldogs in scoring with roughly 15 points per game. He admitted to being a reluctant rebounder at times, since he focused on scoring. Dower's dominant senior campaign earned him All-WCC First team honors. Dower then led Gonzaga to a berth into the NCAA Tournament, earning MVP honors in the WCC tournament.

Professional career 

On July 21, 2014, Dower signed with Boulogne-sur-Mer, in France, in the first division. In November 2014, he announced that he quit the team, citing personal reasons.

On December 9, 2014, Dower signed with BK Valmiera, a team based in Valmiera, Latvia, in the LBL and Baltic League.

On August 17, 2018, Dower signed with MKS Dąbrowa Górnicza of the Polish side. He returned to action after missing two seasons with a knee injury.

Statistics

College

Source:

|-
| align="left" | 2010–11
| align="left" | Gonzaga Bulldogs
| 35 || 0 || 14.1 || 57.5 || 25.0 || 81.2 || 3.26 || 0.34 || 0.40 || 0.74 || 7.60
|-
| align="left" | 2011–12
| align="left" | Gonzaga Bulldogs
| 33 || 0 || 18.1 || 53.8 || 40.0 || 76.7 || 3.73 || 0.58 || 0.52 || 0.30 || 8.30
|-
| align="left" | 2012–13
| align="left" | Gonzaga Bulldogs
| 35 || 8 || 16.0 || 55.8 || 28.6 || 75.4 || 2.69 || 0.31 || 0.46 || 0.43 || 6.91
|-
| align="left" | 2013–14
| align="left" | Gonzaga Bulldogs
| 34 || 31 || 27.0 || 57.1 || 31.6 || 82.5 || 7.21 || 1.09 || 0.44 || 0.71 || 14.38
|-bgcolor=#e9d9ff
| align="left" | Total
| align="left" |
| 137 || 39 || 18.8 || 56.2 || 32.8 || 79.7 || 4.2 || 0.58 || 0.45 || 0.55 || 9.28

References

External links 

 Profile at espn.go.com
 Profile at realgm.com
 Profile at draftexpress.com
 Profile at http://bkvalmiera.lv

1990 births
Living people
American expatriate basketball people in France
American expatriate basketball people in Latvia
American expatriate basketball people in Poland
American men's basketball players
Basketball players from Minnesota
Gonzaga Bulldogs men's basketball players
People from Brooklyn Park, Minnesota
Power forwards (basketball)